The Good Bad Mother is an upcoming South Korean television series starring Ra Mi-ran, Lee Do-hyun and Ahn Eun-jin. It is scheduled to premiere on JTBC on April 26, 2023, and will air every Wednesday and Thursday at 22:30 (KST). It will also be available for streaming on Netflix in selected regions.

Synopsis 
The series depicts a mother and son who set off in search of true happiness only after everything is 'reset' and are expected to leave a deep impression in delightful laughs.

Cast

Main 
 Ra Mi-ran as Jin Young-soon
A single mother who runs a pig farm, and has lived a tenacious life to protect her child.
 Lee Do-hyun as Choi Kang-ho
Young-soon's son who works as a prosecutor and has a cold-hearted personality. He suffers from amnesia in an unexpected accident and returns as a child.
 Ahn Eun-jin as Lee Mi-joo
Kang-ho's old friend and only resting place.

Supporting 
Yoo In-soo as Bang Sam-shik  
The troublemaker of the village.
Jung Woong-in as Oh Tae-soo
A former prosecutor and member of the National Assembly.
Choi Moo-sung as Song Woo-byeok
CEO of Woo-byeok Group.
Kim Won-hae
The head of the Joowori village.
Seo Yi-sook as Ms. Park
The owner of the mill and Bang Sam-sik's mother.
Jang Won-young as Mr. Bang
Bang Sam-sik's father.
Kang Mal-geum as Ms. Jung
Lee Mi-joo's mother.
Baek Hyun-jin
An eccentric composer with the ambition to build a large-scale concert hall in his hometown.
Hong Bi-ra as Oh Ha-yeong
Oh Tae-soo's only daughter.
Park Da-on as Seo-jin
Ye-jin's twin brother and Choi Kang-ho's new friends, who became a child.
Ki So-yu as Ye-jin
Seo-jin's twin sister and Choi Kang-ho's new friends, who became a child.

Others 
 Seo Dong-hyun

Kim Seon-bin
Kang-ho's classmate at the Judicial Research and Training Institute.
Choi Soon-jin as So Ji-seok
Woo-byeok's accomplice.

Special appearance 
 Cho Jin-woong

References

External links
 
 

Korean-language television shows
JTBC television dramas
Television series by JTBC Studios
2023 South Korean television series debuts
Upcoming television series